Arthur Kinnaird may refer to:
 Arthur Kinnaird, 10th Lord Kinnaird (1814–1887), Scottish banker, Liberal politician and evangelical clergyman
 Arthur Kinnaird, 11th Lord Kinnaird (1847–1923), principal of The Football Association and leading footballer